Motion is the fourth studio album by Congolese-born singer TRESOR. It was released through Jacquel Entertainment Group on October 15, 2021, and features guest appearances from local South African musicians such as Ami Faku, Msaki, Da Capo, Sun-El Musician and Scorpion Kings (Kabza De Small and DJ Maphorisa).

Background
On October 4, 2021, TRESOR revealed the album cover and track listing. TRESOR said:
I'm excited to finally announce my new album MOTION comes out this month. I explore and experiment with a lot of new sounds. I can't wait for the world to hear it.

Singles
The single "Zwakala" was released on 22 June 2020. The song was released during the period where women were in the spotlight once again as GBV reared.
TRESOR said:
I was inspired to do something cool with the song. More than anything, the song is a love story and through the video I've pushed the envelope. It talks about a sexual liberation especially for women. Owning their bodies and expressing themselves.

The album's lead single "Lighthouse" was released on 3 September 2021 and featured South African musicians Da Capo and Sun-El Musician. The music video was released on 2 October 2021 and was directed by Tresor and Marty Bleazard.

"Makosa" is the seventh song from Motion and was released on 7 September 2021. The song features amapiano record producers Kabza De Small and DJ Maphorisa. Tresor told Channel O: 
Makosa was inspired by a beautiful summer in Africa. Sunsets in a vibrant African city with people living carefree, sweating and dancing their lives away.

Track listing

Accolades 
Motion scored a nomination for Best Pop Album at the 28th South African Music Awards.

|-
|2022
|<div style="text-align: center;"> Motion
|Best Pop Album 
|

Release history

References

Tresor (singer) albums
2021 albums